Blaise Giezendanner (born 29 November 1991) is a French alpine ski racer. Giezendanner specializes in the speed events of Downhill and Super-G. At the 2013 Winter Universiade, he won a Silver medal in the Downhill, Combined, and a Gold medal in the Super-G.

Career
Giezendanner made his World Cup debut on 23 February 2013 in the Garmisch-Partenkirchen Downhill finishing in 53rd position. In December 2013 he represented France at the 2013 Winter Universiade in Trentino, Italy. He finished 13th in the Giant slalom, 2nd in the Downhill and the Combined and 1st in the Super-G.

On 21 February 2015, he scored his first World Cup points in the Saalbach Downhill. He attained his first Top 10 World Cup result on 7 February 2016, finishing eighth in the Jeongseon Super-G. Apart from FIS events, Giezendanner competed at the 2018 Winter Olympics, and was fourth in the super-G.

World Cup results

Season standings

Race podiums
 1 podium – (1 DH); 6 top tens

World Championship results

Olympic results

Winter Universiade

References

External links
 
 French Ski Team – 2022 men's A team 
 

1991 births
Living people
People from Chamonix
French male alpine skiers
Universiade medalists in alpine skiing
Alpine skiers at the 2018 Winter Olympics
Alpine skiers at the 2022 Winter Olympics
Olympic alpine skiers of France
Université Savoie-Mont Blanc alumni
Sportspeople from Haute-Savoie
Universiade gold medalists for France
Universiade silver medalists for France
Medalists at the 2013 Winter Universiade
21st-century French people